HMS Celebes was the Dutch or Batavian Republic frigate Pallas, under the command of Captain N.S. Aalbers, that the frigate  and brig-sloop  captured on 26 July 1806 in the East Indies.

In the battle with the British vessels, casualties on Pallas were heavy, with eight men killed outright and 32 wounded, including Aalbers and three of his lieutenants. Six of the wounded later died, including Aalbers. British losses by contrast were light, with one man killed and eight wounded on Greyhound and just three wounded on Harrier.

The British took her into service as HMS Makassar (or Macassa), but renamed her within the year to Celebes. Commander Edward Troubridge, formerly of Harrier, became her first British captain. Commander William Wilbraham succeeded him. In 1807 she came under the command of Captain William Pakenham. She was paid off at Calcutta on 23 September 1807. Following a survey, the decision was taken not to commission her into the Royal Navy. She was sold instead.

Notes

Citations

References
 
 

Frigates of the Royal Navy
Captured ships
1781 ships
Frigates of the Netherlands